Chen Tuo (reigned 707 BC – died 706 BC), also known as Chen Ta (陳他) and Wufu (五父), was the thirteenth ruler of the ancient Chinese state of Chen during the early Spring and Autumn period. His given name was Tuo (佗) or Ta (他), and he did not receive a posthumous name because he was a usurper.

Chen Tuo was a son of Duke Wen of Chen and a younger brother of Duke Huan of Chen. In the first month of 707 BC, Duke Huan died under strange circumstances. He was believed to have become demented, and went missing for sixteen days before his body was found. The uncertainty threw the state into chaos, and Chen Tuo took the opportunity to murder his nephew, Duke Huan's son Crown Prince Mian, and usurp the throne.

Duke Huan had a younger son named Yue, who was born to a princess of the neighbouring State of Cai. After Chen Tuo's usurpation, the Cai army attacked and killed Chen Tuo in the eighth month of 706 BC. The marquis of Cai then installed Yue on the Chen throne, to be known as Duke Li of Chen.

References

Bibliography

Monarchs of Chen (state)
8th-century BC Chinese monarchs
706 BC deaths